Dennis the Menace is a daily syndicated newspaper comic strip originally created, written, and illustrated by Hank Ketcham. The comic strip made its debut on March 12, 1951, in 16 newspapers and was originally distributed by Post-Hall Syndicate. It is now written and drawn by Ketcham's former assistants, Marcus Hamilton (weekdays, since 1995), Ron Ferdinand (Sundays, since 1981), and son Scott Ketcham (since 2010), and distributed to at least 1,000 newspapers in 48 countries and in 19 languages by King Features Syndicate. The comic strip usually runs for a single panel on weekdays and a full strip on Sundays.

It became so successful that it was adapted to other popular media, including a 1986 series, several television shows, both live-action and animated, and several feature films, including theatrical and direct-to-video releases.

Coincidentally, a UK comic strip of the same name debuted on the same day. The two are not related and change their names subtly in each other's respective home bases to avoid confusion.

Characters and setting 
Dennis the Menace takes place in a middle-class suburban neighborhood in Wichita, Kansas. In the comics, the Mitchell family lives in a two-story house at the fictional address of 2251 Pine Street. The Wilson family lives next door at 2253 Pine Street. The television series differs, putting the Wilsons at the also-fictional 627 Elm Street.

The Mitchell family 
 Dennis Roger Mitchell is a freckle-faced 5-year-old boy with a troublesome but good-hearted and helpful personality. His long-suffering parents, Henry and Alice Mitchell, can only shake their heads and try to explain their son's antics to others, yet they very much to love and care for him. The comic efficacy of Dennis's personality lies within how his genuine attempts to help those in need, combined with his youthful energy and enthusiasm, frequently lead to trouble wherever he goes (usually at Mr. Wilson's expense). He wears a black T-shirt with blue stripes with red overalls and white sneakers, yet he often prefers going barefoot. He hates carrots and baths, loves root beer (especially with cookies or brownies), ketchup, sandwiches, water pistols, playing with other boys his age, mud puddles, camping, and Westerns (especially those starring Cowboy Bob, the comic's take on the Lone Ranger), and has occasionally been depicted wearing a cowboy costume. Dennis has a Cowboy Bob Deputy Badge, poster, and an autographed picture of Cowboy Bob, as well. Among the running gags: Dennis has a soft spot for animals such as kittens and puppies, which he is always taking home to feed; he loves loud instruments, such as horns and drums, and he ruins Christmas songs with shouts of cowboy songs or annoys adults by shouting out loud. When Dennis is in the local department store trying out toys, such as tricycles, he often ends up breaking them and making his parents buy them. In fact, Dennis nearly causes portrait photographers, hairdressers, bank presidents, grocery-store personnel, kindergarten teachers, restaurant waiters, librarians, museum guards, police officers, bus drivers, house heating equipment repairmen, town mayor, department-store Christmas Santas and saleswomen, drug store salesmen, hardware store salesmen, shoe salesmen, barbers, and the local post office workers to have nervous breakdowns when he comes around. A running gag is that Dennis causes chaos wherever he visits, such as the city park, a Marineland Aquarium, the US Army, and even on vacation trips to Mexico and Hollywood. Despite all this, he is a "popular kid" with his peers, having countless friends both at his school and around the neighborhood, who are taken with his very fun-loving demeanor. Dennis also believes in the Easter Bunny and Santa Claus. Another running gag is Dennis dreaming that he meets Santa Claus on Christmas Eve and causing chaos for everyone else.
 Henry Mitchell, age 32, is Dennis' father, a workaday teacher at Dennis's school; he is an alumnus of Wilberforce University with a master's degree in architecture. Henry seems to understand Dennis more than his wife does, especially in affairs of the heart. One example was when a furious Dennis stormed in, saying, "Woman can say some of the stupidest things!," Henry knowingly said to Alice, "Margaret." Another time, while Dennis was watching Gina, he confided to his dad, "There's somethin' about Gina that I can't figure out." Henry wisely advised his son, "Wait." Again, Henry and Alice overhear Dennis tell Gina that she "smelled better than a plateful of peanut butter sandwiches." Henry remarks, "The ultimate compliment." Like his creator Hank Ketcham, Henry served in the United States Navy; starting as a position as a quartermaster (helmsman) second class on a US Navy ship, he ended up on an aircraft carrier and rose to the rank of chief petty officer. Among his hobbies are playing card games such as poker, bird watching, and playing the ukulele and singing old songs. A running gag is that Henry often plays the straight man dupe—either resulting from Dennis's "helpfulness," or because of his own foolishness; once, he tried to save money on a Christmas tree by cutting one down in the country—and ended up paying $20.00 ($10.00 for a fine and $10.00 for the owner charging him for the tree).
 Alice Mitchell, née Aberdeen is Dennis' stay-at-home mother, who is usually the reassuring figure to whom Dennis can run when things get too overwhelming, ready to greet him with a warm hug. Although she grew up among animals on a chicken ranch, a running gag is that Alice is Ophidiophobic. (She also dislikes mice and white rats, implying she is musiphobic as well.)  She is the president of a local bridge club. Another running gag involves Dennis's ever-changing parade of new babysitters; no one will take the job twice, much to Alice's annoyance. Alice is the disciplinarian in the Mitchell household; for example, she punishes Dennis for his misbehavior by having him sit in the corner in a rocking chair for timeout. 
 Ruff Mitchell is Dennis's pet dog (a Newfoundland mix) and best friend. He is always eagerly following him around, accompanying him while Dennis is running, or riding his bike or skateboard. Another running gag is that although Ruff chases cats, he is actually afraid of them.
 Hot Dog is Dennis's rarely seen cat, which usually commiserates with him while he sits in the corner and reflects on his wrongdoings. Dennis gave the cat its name after the cat ate a package of hot dogs.
 Barney is another cat of the Mitchells.
 Grandparents Mr. and Mrs. Mitchell
 Grampa (Arnold "Swede" Aberdeen) is Alice's father, who spoils Dennis often. He evokes the unintentional jealousy of Mr. Wilson, for he gets to see Dennis occasionally, but Mr. Wilson sees him all the time. Because they are so much alike, Dennis and Grampa Johnson get along well. Mr. Wilson and Grampa have different perspectives on life and how to live it. While Mr. Wilson believes in acting one's age, Grampa encourages Dennis to enjoy life to the fullest. His wife's status is unknown; she is never seen in the comics, although she is mentioned four times—twice when, thanks to Dennis, Alice finds out Henry destroyed his Christmas gift (a tie) from his mother in law; another time a furious Alice finds out that Henry had thrown his mother-in-law's gift (a tie) into the trash. Another time, Alice wished her mother a Happy Mother's Day by telephone. Grandpa mentions his wife to Dennis but not her status
 Uncle Fred and Aunt Mollie
 Uncle Richard and Aunt Ginny
 Uncle John lives in Florida. The Mitchells visited him once for a vacation.
 Uncle Al lives in Texas and works in the "oil business." He runs a small oil and gas station.
 Uncle Charlie
 Uncle Ernie and Aunt Blanche
Aunt Betty
 Aunt Hetty
 Aunt Sue

The Wilsons 
 George Everett Wilson Sr. is Dennis's cranky, cantankerous, middle-aged next-door neighbor, a retired postal carrier and (at least as far as Dennis is concerned) his best adult friend. Not much is told about his early life except he grew up on a farm, went through The Great Depression of the 1930s, and served in World War II. Dennis loves Mr. Wilson, but unintentionally annoys him, as he regularly disrupts Mr. Wilson's attempts at a serene, quiet life; he often interrupts Mr. Wilson's hobbies such as gardening and bird watching, at times accidentally damaging his property. As a result, he displays a less than cordial attitude towards the young boy, though Dennis continues his well-meaning intrusions unabated. Actually, as many readers suspected, he is secretly fond of Dennis and misses him when he is away, although he would never openly admit it. On one occasion when the Mitchells went to Hollywood for two weeks, Mr. Wilson kept seeing Dennis' face everywhere! Mr. Wilson is named after a teacher Hank Ketcham knew. Dennis often (especially in the television series) refers to him as "Good Ol' Mr. Wilson." Although a running gag is that Dennis's pranks drive Mr. Wilson crazy, at times Dennis tries to do nice things for Mr. Wilson, such as the time Dennis left Ruff the dog and Hot Dog the cat with Mr Wilson so he would not be lonely on Father's Day, while Dennis and his father went to a baseball game, or the time Dennis tries to cheer Mr. Wilson up on April Fool's day by placing a fake "Mitchell House for sale" sign up.
 Martha Wilson is Mr. Wilson's engaging wife, who adores Dennis. Mrs. Wilson freely dotes on him and plies him with freshly baked cookies and milk. Martha sees Dennis as a surrogate grandson. By 1975, George and Martha had been married for 25 years.
 John Wilson is Mr. Wilson's brother.
 Eloise Wilson is John's wife, Mr. Wilson's sister-in-law.
 Earl Wilson is Mr. Wilson's estranged son.
 Elena Wilson is Earl's wife.
 Winnie Wilson is Mr. Wilson's granddaughter and Earl's daughter.
 Walter "Walt" Wilson is Mr. Wilson's grandson and Earl's son.
 Keith Wilson is Mr. Wilson's grandson and Earl's son.
 Sammy Wilson is Mr. Wilson's grandson and Earl's son.
 George Wilson Jr. is Mr. Wilson's son.
 Edna Wilson is George Jr.'s wife.
 Tammy Wilson is Mr. Wilson's daughter.
 George Wilson III is Mr. Wilson's grandson.
 Will Wilson is Mr. Wilson's grandson.
 Helga Wilson is Mr. Wilson's granddaughter.
 Uncle Ned is Mr. Wilson's 70-year-old uncle who visited his nephew in 1964.

Dennis' friends 
 Tommy Anderson is Dennis' best friend (after Mr. Wilson). This character eventually disappeared from the strip, although he does make appearances in the Dennis the Menace Pocket Full of Fun books.
 Joey McDonald is loyal, timid, and not too bright. He is a year younger than Dennis. He usually plays the sidekick to Dennis's schemes, and sees him as a big-brother figure. Dennis often gives him naïve advice, and gives him little "nuggets" of wisdom and insight.
 Margaret Wade is a freckled, red-haired, bespectacled know-it-all whose cloying and self-important demeanor is always getting on Dennis's nerves. She is attracted to Dennis and is stubbornly confident in the belief that she will marry him in adulthood, but he clearly has no interest in her. She always tries to improve Dennis and his manners, but succeeds only in annoying him. She has a certain amount of dislike for Gina, whom she sees as her competition. Gina gains Dennis' respect and admiration by just being herself, and Margaret's pretensions fail to impress him. Margaret, who is two years older than Dennis, is very ambitious: when she was five, she decided to join the Camp Fire Girls when she reaches the age of seven, and in one cartoon, she sells Girl Scout cookies to the Mitchells. She likes taking gymnastics and ballet, and singing Christmas carols.  She is a devout religious believer, and has had pets of her own—four white Persian cats: one named Charlie, one named Prudence, one named Snowflake, and another named Mr. Coddles (whom she wheels around in a baby carriage). Whenever Margaret seeks to show him kindness, such as inviting him over to her house to help decorate a Christmas tree, be a guest at her birthday party, or when Dennis tries to have Margaret give him too much candy, Dennis' "helpfulness" results in his expulsion. Regardless of his ill-will toward Margaret, Dennis cannot resist eating at the Wades'. Margaret and Dennis are not always adversaries. Dennis once used a water pistol to spray both Margaret and Gina with his mother's perfume, prompting both to play with him and angering his mother.  Margaret is a frequent victim of Dennis's practical jokes, such as being sprayed by a garden hose. On one Valentine's Day, Dennis gave "trick" Valentine's messages to Margaret, Gina, and Sally that had messages read "I DON'T Like", which earned him punishment. In one April Fool's Day comic, Dennis decided to trick Margaret with compliments instead of pranks; to his horror, she accepted the joke as real and dragged Dennis to hear her piano playing. Although she is fond of Dennis, she can lose her temper and "bop" him.
 Gina Gillotti is a fiercely independent young Italian-American girl, on whom Dennis is mostly unaware that he has a crush. Gina is tomboyish yet still feminine in appearance. She also likes Dennis in a future-sweethearts manner, but in contrast to his dislike of Margaret, Dennis actually enjoys Gina's company because of her independent mind and their common interests. Gina is aware of her femininity, and woe betide anyone who thinks otherwise. Just as Margaret had "flipped" Dennis in karate, Gina once "flipped" Dennis in judo.
 Jackson is an African American character whom Ketcham decided to add to the cast in the late 1960s. Ketcham designed Jackson in the tradition of a stereotypical cartoon pickaninny, with huge lips, big white eyes, and just a suggestion of an Afro hair style. A panel from May 13, 1970, depicted Jackson and Dennis playing in the backyard, with Dennis saying to his father, "I'm having some race trouble with Jackson. He runs FASTER than I do!" The character depiction was not received well. Protests erupted in Detroit, Little Rock, Miami, and St. Louis, and debris was thrown at the offices of the Post Dispatch. Taken aback, Ketcham issued a statement explaining that his intentions were innocent, and Jackson was not seen in the comics again. However, another African American character named Jay Weldon appeared in the 1986 animated series to far less controversy, as he was not designed as a stereotype.
 Ben is a Jewish friend of Dennis.
 Cowboy Bob is a film cowboy whom Dennis idolizes. He appears in a series of Westerns known as Cowboy Bob films. The boy fails to realize that Westerns are rarely made in his day and that the films he watches are reruns. In one story arc, Dennis' parents invite the retired actor to a party, and Dennis meets him and comments that he must be "Cowboy Bob's grandpa!"

History

Inspiration 
The inspiration for the comic strip came from Dennis Ketcham, the real-life son of Hank Ketcham, who, at four years old, refused to take a nap and made a complete mess of his room. Hank tried many possible names for the character, and translated them into rough pencil sketches, but when his studio door flew open, and his then-wife Alice, in utter exasperation, exclaimed, "Your son is a menace!," the "Dennis the Menace" name stuck. The character of Henry Mitchell bore a striking resemblance to Ketcham, while the Mitchell family of Dennis, Henry/Hank, and Alice were all named after the Ketcham's.

Visuals 
Ketcham's line work has been highly praised over the years. A review on comicbookbin.com states: "...a growing legion of cartoonists, scholars, aficionados, etc. have come to appreciate the artistry of Dennis's creator, Hank Ketcham.  Ketcham's beautiful artwork defines cartooning elegance.  The design, the composition, and the line:  it's all too, too beautiful." AV Club reviewer Noel Murray wrote: "Ketcham also experimented with his line a little early on, tightening and thickening without losing the looseness and spontaneity that remains the strip's best aspect even now."

In 2005, Dennis appeared as a guest for Blondie and Dagwood's 75th anniversary party in the comic strip Blondie.

Awards 
Ketcham received the Reuben Award for the strip in 1953.
He also was made honorary mayor of Wichita. He was quoted as saying, "I set the whole thing in Wichita, Kansas, and as a result I got made an honorary mayor of Wichita."

Ketcham retires 

Hank Ketcham retired from the comic strip in 1994, turning over production of the strip to his assistants Ron Ferdinand and Marcus Hamilton. They continued their run after Ketcham's death in 2001, alongside Scott Ketcham since 2010.

Advertising 
Dennis the Menace appeared in A&W Restaurants advertising in the 1960s, then Dairy Queen marketing from 1971 until 2001, when he was dropped because Dairy Queen felt children could no longer relate to him. Dennis also appeared in the Sears Roebuck Wish Book Christmas catalog in the 1970s.

Comic books 
Dennis the Menace has been published in comic books and comic digests from the 1950s through the 1980s by a variety of publishers, including Standard/Pines (1953–58), Fawcett Comics (1958–80, during their only return to comics after settling the Captain Marvel lawsuit and selling much of their comics division to Charlton Comics), and Marvel Comics (1981–82). These included both newspaper strip reprints and original Dennis the Menace comic book stories, produced by others besides Ketcham. Al Wiseman, one of Ketcham's assistants in the 1950s and '60s, worked on many of them. Ron Ferdinand, Ketcham's Sunday page artist, drew several of the Dennis stories in the Marvel books, including the cover for issue No. 11.

Giant series 
The main comic book series (simply named Dennis the Menace) ran in tandem with the "Giant" series. The Dennis the Menace Giant Vacation Special and Dennis the Menace Christmas Issue were published by Standard in 1955. Those issues inaugurated the Giants series, which was published by Pines for issues 2–6, and continued by Hilden/Fawcett for issues 6–75. The Giant series was later renamed the Dennis the Menace Bonus Magazine Series, which started with issue No. 76 in 1970. CBS and Hilden later retitled the series as The Dennis the Menace Big Bonus Series, which ran through issue #194 in October 1979.

Other series 
By October 1979, Fawcett began publishing a separate series of 36 issues titled Dennis the Menace and Mr. Wilson. By the second issue, the series was rechristened Dennis the Menace and His Friends which now involved Dennis, Mr. Wilson, friends Joey and Margaret, and dog Ruff. Because of this, the Mr. Wilson stories were alternated with the three characters as Ruff, Joey, and Margaret who each shared a No. 1 issue with Dennis.

Three other series of Dennis the Menace comic books also were published, beginning in 1961. First was Dennis the Menace and His Dog, Ruff. Dennis the Menace and His Pal, Joey was published in summer 1961, and Dennis the Menace and Margaret was published in the winter of 1969.

In 1972, as part of a bonus magazine series, Fawcett published a "Short Stuff Special" where Dennis visited Children's Fairyland in Oakland, California.

Bible Kids series 
In 1977, Word Books, Inc. (now HarperCollins) commissioned Hank Ketcham Enterprises, Inc. to produce a series of 10 comic books under the title Dennis and the Bible Kids, with the usual cast of characters reading (and sometimes partly acting out) the stories of Joseph, Moses, David, Esther, Jesus, and other Biblical characters. These were sold through Christian bookstores and related outlets. Each issue contained several inspirational renderings by Hank Ketcham himself.

Marvel series 
The Dennis the Menace Fun Fest and the Dennis the Menace Big Bonus series were revived for a short-issue run in 1980:
 January: The Dennis the Menace Fun Fest #16
 February: The Dennis the Menace Big Bonus #10
 March: The Dennis the Menace Fun Fest #17
 April: The Dennis the Menace Big Bonus #11

After these revival series, the Hilden and CBS comics run came to an end in 1980. Ketcham had half of the comic book rights purchased by Stan Lee and Marvel Comics, so they were able to produce a new series of Dennis the Menace comic books. The new Marvel series ran from December 1981 to November 1982. The smaller Dennis the Menace comic digests were published continually by Fawcett and Hilden between 1969 and 1980, and they were briefly resurrected in reprints by Marvel in 1982 for a run of three issues.

List of comic books

Main series

Other series

Book compilations 
Dennis the Menace has also been published in mass market paperback collections, made up of newspaper strip reprints:

 Dennis the Menace (1952) Avon (also published in hardcover by Henry Holt & Co.)
 More Dennis the Menace (1954) Avon (also in hardcover by Holt)
 Baby Sitter's Guide by Dennis the Menace (1955, 1961) Pocket Books, Fawcett (also in hardcover by Holt)
 Wanted: Dennis the Menace (1955) Fawcett (also in hardcover by Holt)
 Dennis the Menace Rides Again (1956, 1971) PB, Fawcett (also in hardcover by Holt)
 Dennis the Menace vs. Everybody (1957) PB (also in hardcover by Holt)
 Dennis the Menace: Household Hurricane (1958, 1963) PB, Fawcett (also in hardcover by Holt)
 The Adventures of the Pickle (1958) Corgi Books
 In this Corner... Dennis the Menace (1959) Fawcett (also in hardcover by Holt)
 Dennis the Menace ...Teacher's Threat (1960) Fawcett (also in hardcover by Holt)
 Dennis the Menace: Voted Most Likely (1960) Fawcett
 Dennis the Menace, A.M. *Ambassador of Mischief (1961) Fawcett (also in hardcover by HRW)
 Dennis the Menace: Happy Half-Pint (1962) Fawcett (also in hardcover by Random House)
 Dennis the Menace ...Who, Me? (1963) Fawcett (also in hardcover by Random House)
 Dennis the Menace: Make-Believe Angel (1964) Fawcett
 Dennis the Menace ...Here Comes Trouble (1966) Fawcett
 Dennis the Menace and Poor Ol' Mr. Wilson (1967) Fawcett
 Dennis the Menace: All-American Kid (1968) Fawcett
 Dennis the Menace and His Pal Joey (1968) Fawcett
 Dennis the Menace: Your Friendly Neighborhood Kid (1969) Fawcett
 Dennis the Menace: Perpetual Motion (1969) Fawcett
 Dennis the Menace ...Everybody's Little Helper (1970) Fawcett
 Dennis the Menace: Non-Stop Nuisance (1970) Fawcett
 Dennis the Menace: Surprise Package (1971) Fawcett
 Dennis the Menace: Short 'n' Snappy (1971) Fawcett
 Dennis the Menace: Where the Action Is (1971) Fawcett
 Dennis the Menace: Dennis Power (1972) Fawcett
 Dennis the Menace: Just for Fun (1973) Fawcett
 Dennis the Menace: The Kid Next Door (1973) Fawcett
 Dennis the Menace: Busybody (1974) Fawcett
 Dennis the Menace: Little Pip-Squeak (1974) Fawcett
 Dennis the Menace: Play It Again, Dennis (1975) Fawcett
 Dennis the Menace to the Core (1975) Fawcett
 Dennis the Menace: Little Man in a Big Hurry (1976) Fawcett
 Dennis the Menace: Short Swinger (1976) Fawcett
 Dennis the Menace and His Girls (1977) Fawcett
 Dennis the Menace: "Your Mother's Calling!" (1977) Fawcett
 Dennis the Menace: Ol' Droopy Drawers (1978) Fawcett
 Someone's in the Kitchen with Dennis the Menace (1978) Fawcett
 Dennis the Menace: Driving Mother Up the Wall (1979) Fawcett
 Dennis the Menace: I Done It MY Way (1979) Fawcett
 Dennis the Menace: Short in the Saddle (1979) Fawcett
 Dennis the Menace: Ain't Misbehavin (1980) Fawcett
 Dennis the Menace: Stayin' Alive (1980) Fawcett
 Dennis the Menace: Good Intenshuns (1981) Fawcett
 Dennis the Menace: One More Time! (1981) Fawcett
 Dennis the Menace: The Way I Look at It... (1982) Fawcett
 Dennis the Menace: Dog's Best Friend (1982) Fawcett
 Dennis the Menace: Supercharged and Ever Ready (1983) Fawcett
 Dennis the Menace: Sunrise Express (1983) Fawcett

In 1990, Abbeville Press published Hank Ketcham's fully illustrated autobiography: The Merchant of Dennis (hardcover).  The book was reprinted by Fantagraphics in 2005 (trade paperback). Abbeville also published a softcover retrospective of the strip in 1991, Dennis the Menace: His First 40 Years.

 Hank Ketcham's Complete Dennis the Menace 
In 2005, comics publisher Fantagraphics began to reprint Ketcham's entire run on Dennis the Menace (excluding Sunday strips) in a projected 25-volume series over 11 years. No new volumes have been issued since 2009 and it is unknown when and if the series will resume. They are published in hardcover editions as well as paperback.

 Hank Ketcham's Complete Dennis the Menace, 1951–1952 (2005) 
 Hank Ketcham's Complete Dennis the Menace, 1953–1954 (2006) 
 Hank Ketcham's Complete Dennis the Menace, 1955–1956 (2006) 
 Hank Ketcham's Complete Dennis the Menace, 1957–1958 (2007) 
 Hank Ketcham's Complete Dennis the Menace, 1959–1960 (2008) 
 Hank Ketcham's Complete Dennis the Menace, 1961–1962 (2009) 

 Worldwide success 
 Film and television 
Dennis the Menace has been the subject of a number of adaptations. The first one produced is a CBS sitcom that aired from 1959 to 1963 starring Jay North as Dennis, Herbert Anderson as Henry Mitchell; Joseph Kearns as George Wilson, and subsequently Gale Gordon as his brother, John Wilson. North also appeared as Dennis on an episode of The Donna Reed Show and in the theatrical film Pepe (both 1960). On September 11, 1987, a Dennis the Menace live-action television film was broadcast; it was later released on video under the title Dennis the Menace: Dinosaur Hunter. Another live-action Dennis the Menace film, starring Walter Matthau as Mr. Wilson and Mason Gamble as Dennis, was released to theaters in 1993. It was originally titled The Real Dennis the Menace before the final name was approved. This was followed with the direct-to-video Dennis the Menace Strikes Again in 1998, starring Don Rickles as Mr. Wilson. The most recent film adaptation, A Dennis the Menace Christmas was released to DVD on November 6, 2007. The Warner Bros. production starred Robert Wagner as Mr. Wilson, Louise Fletcher as Mrs. Wilson, and Maxwell Perry Cotton, then a six-year-old actor, as Dennis.

 Animation 
Dennis the Menace was adapted into an animated special, Dennis the Menace in Mayday for Mother which aired in 1981 and was produced by  DePatie–Freeling Enterprises and Mirisch Films. A daily animated syndicated series was produced by DIC Entertainment in 1986 with Brennan Thicke as the voice of Dennis, also featuring Phil Hartman who voiced George Wilson and Henry Mitchell. DIC also produced the All-New Dennis the Menace for CBS Saturday Mornings in 1993 with Adam Wylie voicing Dennis. An animated movie, Dennis the Menace in Cruise Control, premiered as part of Nickelodeon's Sunday Movie Toons block in 2002 and later released to DVD.

 List of film and TV adaptations Films Dennis the Menace: Dinosaur Hunter (1987, live-action TV movie)
 Dennis the Menace (1993, live-action)
 Dennis the Menace Strikes Again (1998, live-action DTV)
 Dennis the Menace in Cruise Control (2002, animated TV movie)
 A Dennis the Menace Christmas (2007, live-action DTV)Television shows and specials Dennis the Menace (1959, live-action)
 Dennis the Menace in Mayday for Mother (1981, animated, TV special)
 Dennis the Menace (1986, animated)
 All-New Dennis the Menace (1993, animated)

 Playground 
In 1952, Hank Ketcham spearheaded the construction of the Dennis the Menace Playground, designed by Arch Garner. It opened in Monterey, California on November 17, 1956. The playground featured a bronze statue of Dennis sculpted by Wah Chang. On the night of October 25, 2006, the 125 lb statue, which was estimated to be worth $30,000, was stolen from the playground. In April 2007, it was replaced by a reproduction of another Dennis statue Chang made for the Ketchams. It was donated by Willis W. and Ethel M. Clark Foundation. In 2015 the missing statue was found in a scrap yard in Florida, returned to Monterey, and installed in front of the city recreation office.

 Video games 
 Dennis the Menace (known as Dennis''''' in Europe), a video game tie-in to the 1993 feature film, was released that same year by Ocean Software for the Super NES, Amiga and Game Boy.

Dennis the Menace in other languages
The comic strip has been translated into many foreign languages, which has helped make the strip's characters famous worldwide.

References

External links 
 
 Dennis the Menace at King Features
 List and short bios of the strip's characters
 NCS Awards

 
1951 comics debuts
American comic strips
Comics set in Kansas
Comic strips set in the United States
Gag cartoon comics
Gag-a-day comics
American comics adapted into films
Comics adapted into animated series
Comics adapted into television series
Comics adapted into video games